Group A of the 2013 FIBA Asia Championship took place from 1 to 3 August 2013. This is the preliminary round of the 2013 FIBA Asia Championship, with the three teams with the best records (Chinese Taipei, the Philippines and Jordan) advancing to 2013 FIBA Asia Championship Group E. Saudi Arabia, the last placed team, was relegated to the 13th–15th classification round.

All games were played at the Mall of Asia Arena in Pasay, Philippines.

Summary
On the first day, Chinese Taipei defeated Jordan in a close match; meanwhile, the Philippines expectedly won against Saudi Arabia, but on a closer-than-expected winning margin. The next day, the Taiwanese blew out Saudi Arabia on their second match, while the Philippines outlasted Jordan in the final minutes to win. In a game that is colored by the killing of the Philippine Coast Guard to a Taiwanese fisherman at the waters near Batanes, and the subsequent withdrawal of invitation from the 2013 William Jones Cup by Taiwanese to the Philippines, which were defending champions, Chinese Taipei banked on Lu Cheng-ju and Lin Chih-chieh to defeat the Filipinos to win the group. In a virtual elimination game, the Jordanians won by 16 points to eliminate the Saudi Arabians.

Standings

|}

All times are local (UTC+8).

August 1

Jordan vs. Chinese Taipei

|-
|4 ||align=left|Fadel Alnajjar || 13 || 0/0 || 0 || 0/0 || 0 || 0/2 || 0 || 0 || 1 || 1 || 2 || 4 || 0 || 0 || 0 || 0
|-
|5 ||align=left|Ahmad Al-Dwairi || 5 || 0/0 || 0 || 0/0 || 0 || 0/2 || 0 || 1 || 0 || 1 || 0 || 2 || 1 || 1 || 1 || 0
|-
|6 ||align=left|Hani Alfaraj || 1 || 0/0 || 0/0 || 0 || 0/0 || 0 || 0 || 0 || 0 || 0 || 0 || 0 || 0 || 0 || 0 || 0
|-
|7 ||align=left|Ahmad Alhamarsheh || 27 || 2/5 || 40 || 2/4 || 50 || 1/1 || 100 || 1 || 5 || 6 || 4 || 5 || 0 || 0 || 0 || 5
|-
|8 ||align=left|Jimmy Baxter || 36 || 10/20 || 50 || 5/9 || 55.6 || 5/5 || 100 || 0 || 6 || 6 || 4 || 0 || 3 || 2 || 0 || 30
|-
|9 ||align=left|Khaldoon Abu-Ruqayyah || 21 || 3/10 || 30 || 1/4 || 25 || 0/1 || 0 || 0 || 0 || 0 || 0 || 1 || 2 || 0 || 0 || 8
|-
|10 ||align=left|Abdallah AbuQoura || 1 || 0/0 || 0 || 0/0 || 0 || 0/0 || 0 || 0 || 0 || 0 || 0 || 0 || 0 || 0 || 0 || 0
|-
|11 ||align=left|Wesam Al-Sous || 30 || 6/11 || 54.5 || 2/3 || 66.7 || 2/3 || 66.7 || 0 || 2 || 2 || 4 || 5 || 1 || 1 || 0 || 18
|-
|12 ||align=left|Mahmoud Abdeen || 13 || 4/6 || 66.7 || 3/4 || 75 || 1/3 || 33.3 || 1 || 0 || 1 || 1 || 1 || 2 || 0 || 0 || 10
|-
|13 ||align=left|Mohammad Shaher Hussein || 12 || 0/3 || 0 || 0/3 || 0 || 2/2 || 100 || 4 || 3 || 7 || 0 || 4 || 0 || 0 || 0 || 2
|-
|14 ||align=left|Mohammad Hadrab || 20 || 3/4 || 75 || 3/4 || 75 || 2/2 || 100 || 1 || 3 || 4 || 0 || 5 || 1 || 0 || 1 || 8
|-
|15 ||align=left|Ali Jamal Zaghab || 21 || 3/8 || 37.5 || 3/8 || 37.5 || 0/0 || 0 || 3 || 1 || 4 || 2 || 3 || 5 || 0 || 1 || 6
|-
|align=left colspan=2|Totals || 200 || 31/67 || 46.3 || 19/39 || 48.7 || 13/21 || 61.9 || 12 || 21 || 33 || 17 || 31 || 15 || 4 || 3 || 87
|}

|-
|4 ||align=left|Tseng Wen-ting || 15 || 3/6 || 50 || 3/5 || 60 || 0/2 || 0 || 1 || 5 || 6 || 4 || 2 || 3 || 0 || 2 || 6
|-
|5 ||align=left|Quincy Davis || 28 || 8/9 || 89 || 8/9 || 89 || 2/2 || 100 || 5 || 6 || 11 || 1 || 2 || 3 || 0 || 0 || 18
|-
|6 ||align=left|Lee Hsueh-lin || 21 || 2/3 || 67 || 2/3 || 67 || 0/0 || 0 || 0 || 4 || 4 || 2 || 2 || 2 || 0 || 0 || 4
|-
|7 ||align=left|Tien Lei || 26 || 5/12 || 42 || 5/10 || 50 || 2/5 || 40 || 0 || 2 || 2 || 2 || 2 || 0 || 1 || 0 || 12
|-
|8 ||align=left|Chen Shih-chieh || 13 || 4/6 || 67 || 3/5 || 60 || 1/3 || 33 || 2 || 1 || 3 || 1 || 4 || 0 || 1 || 1 || 10
|-
|9 ||align=left|Hung Chih-shan || 5 ||0/0 || 0 || 0/0 || 0 || 0/0 || 0 || 0 || 1 || 1 || 2 || 0 || 0 || 0 || 0 || 0
|-
|10 ||align=left|Chou Po-Chen || 1 || 0/0 || 0 || 0/0 || 0 || 0/2 || 0 || 0 || 1 || 1 || 0 || 1 || 0 || 0 || 0 || 0
|-
|11 ||align=left|Yang Chin-min || 19 || 0/2 || 0 || 0/0 || 0 || 5/8 || 63 || 1 || 5 || 6 || 1 || 5 || 0 || 1 || 0 || 5
|-
|12 ||align=left|Lin Chih-chieh || 34 || 7/13 || 54 || 3/5 || 60 || 9/14 || 64 || 2 || 4 || 6 || 5 || 3 || 4 || 1 || 0 || 27
|-
|13 ||align=left|Lu Cheng-ju || 10 || 1/3 || 33 || 1/2 || 50 || 0/0 || 0 || 0 || 0 || 0 || 1 || 0 || 1 || 0 || 0 || 2
|-
|14 ||align=left|Tsai Wen-cheng || 14 || 1/3 || 33 || 1/3 || 33 || 2/2 || 100 || 0 || 0 || 0 || 2 || 1 || 0 || 1 || 0 || 4
|-
|15 ||align=left|Douglas Creighton || 8 || 1/3 || 33 || 1/1 || 100 || 0/0 || 0 || 0 || 1 || 1 || 0 || 1 || 0 || 1 || 0 || 3
|-
|align=left colspan=2|Totals || 194 || 32/60 || 53 || 27/43 || 63 || 21/38 || 55 || 11 || 30 || 41 || 17 || 20 || 14 || 6 || 3 || 91
|}

Saudi Arabia vs. Philippines

|-
|4 ||align=left|Mohammed Al-Marwani || 33 || 3/10 || 30 || 3/10 || 30 || 6/6 || 100 || 1 || 11 || 12 || 1 || 3 || 1 || 0 || 1 || 12
|-
|5 ||align=left|Marzouq Al-Muwallad || 15 || 0/3 || 0 || 0/1 || 0 || 4/8 || 50 || 0 || 3 || 3 || 2 || 3 || 3 || 1 || 0 || 4
|-
|6 ||align=left|Mohammed Al-Sager || 9 || 0/2 || 0 || 0/1 || 0 || 0/0 || 0 || 1 || 2 || 3 || 0 || 1 || 1 || 0 || 0 || 0
|-
|7 ||align=left|Jaber Kabe || 19 || 1/7 || 14.3 || 1/3 || 33.3 || 0/2 || 0 || 1 || 1 || 2 || 1 || 4 || 1 || 1 || 0 || 2
|-
|8 ||align=left|Fahad Belal || 17 || 0/5 || 0 || 0/0 || 0 || 2/2 || 100 || 1 || 2 || 3 || 2 || 0 || 1 || 1 || 0 || 2
|-
|9 ||align=left|Mustafa Al-Hwsawi || 30 || 4/8 || 50 || 3/4 || 75 || 2/3 || 66.7 || 1 || 5 || 6 || 2 || 1 || 0 || 0 || 1 || 11
|-
|10 ||align=left|Mohammed Abujabal ||colspan=16 align=left|Did not play
|-
|11 ||align=left|Turki Al-Muhanna ||colspan=16 align=left|Did not play
|-
|12 ||align=left|Mathna Al-Marwani || 25 || 2/13 || 15.4 || 0/9 || 0 || 2/4 || 50 || 2 || 4 || 6 || 2 || 2 || 2 || 0 || 0 || 8
|-
|13 ||align=left|Ahmed Al-Mukhtar ||colspan=16 align=left|Did not play
|-
|14 ||align=left|Ayman Al-Muwallad || 35 || 5/11 || 45.5 || 1/2 || 50 || 4/5 || 80 || 0 || 0 || 0 || 1 || 1 || 1 || 0 || 0 || 18
|-
|15 ||align=left|Nassir Abo Jalas || 17 || 2/5 || 40 || 2/4 || 50 || 5/8 || 62.5 || 1 || 2 || 3 || 0 || 2 || 0 || 0 || 0 || 9
|-
|align=left colspan=2|Totals || 200 || 17/64 || 26.6 || 10/34 || 29.4 || 25/38 || 65.8 || 13 || 30 || 38 || 11 || 17 || 10 || 3 || 2 || 66
|}

|-
|4 ||align=left|Jimmy Alapag || 14 || 2/4 || 50 || 1/1 || 100 || 0/0 || 0 || 0 || 2 || 2 || 0 || 1 || 0 || 0 || 0 || 5
|-
|5 ||align=left|LA Tenorio || 21 || 5/10 || 50 || 3/5 || 60 || 0/0 || 0 || 0 || 6 || 6 || 6 || 3 || 5 || 0 || 0 || 12
|-
|6 ||align=left|Jeffrei Chan || 19 || 2/5 || 40 || 0/0 || 0 || 0/0 || 0 || 0 || 1 || 1 || 1 || 2 || 0 || 0 || 0 || 6
|-
|7 ||align=left|Jayson William || 10 || 2/5 || 40 || 2/5 || 40 || 2/3 || 66.7 || 0 || 3 || 3 || 1 || 2 || 0 || 1 || 0 || 6
|-
|8 ||align=left|Gary David || 12 || 2/11 || 18.2 || 2/5 || 40 || 0/0 || 0 || 0 || 1 || 1 || 0 || 2 || 0 || 0 || 0 || 4
|-
|9 ||align=left|Ranidel de Ocampo || 15 || 4/5 || 80 || 3/3 || 100 || 0/0 || 0 || 2 || 4 || 6 || 3 || 4 || 2 || 0 || 0 || 9
|-
|10 ||align=left|Gabe Norwood || 21 || 1/2 || 50 || 1/1 || 100 || 0/0 || 0 || 0 || 2 || 2 || 0 || 1 || 0 || 0 || 1 || 2
|-
|11 ||align=left|Marcus Douthit || 21 || 4/10 || 40 || 4/10 || 40 || 2/3 || 66.7 || 4 || 7 || 11 || 1|| 4 || 5 || 0 || 2 || 10
|-
|12 ||align=left|Larry Fonacier || 23 || 4/9 || 44.4 || 2/6 || 33.3 || 2/2 || 100 || 0 || 1 || 1 || 4 || 2 || 0 || 1 || 0 || 12
|-
|13 ||align=left|June Mar Fajardo || 9 || 1/3 || 33.3 || 1/3 || 33.3 || 0/0 || 0 || 1 || 1 || 2 || 0 || 4 || 1 || 0 || 0 || 2
|-
|14 ||align=left|Japeth Aguilar || 15 || 1/5 || 20 || 1/4 || 25 || 0/0 || 0 || 2 || 3 || 5 || 0 || 2 || 0 || 0 || 2 || 2
|-
|15 ||align=left|Marc Pingris || 21 || 4/7 || 57.1 || 4/7 || 57.1 || 0/2 || 0 || 5 || 4 || 9 || 1 || 3 || 1 || 0 || 1 || 8
|-
|align=left colspan=2|Totals || 200 || 32/76 || 42.1 || 24/50 || 48 || 6/10 || 60 || 15 || 35 || 49 || 17 || 30 || 14 || 2 || 6 || 78
|}

August 2

Chinese Taipei vs. Saudi Arabia

|-
|4 ||align=left|Tseng Wen-ting || 14|| 0/1|| 0|| 0/1|| 0|| 0/0|| 0|| 1|| 5|| 6|| 0|| 4|| 1|| 0|| 0||0
|-
|5 ||align=left|Quincy Davis || 21|| 6/7|| 85.7|| 6/7|| 85.7|| 2/2|| 100|| 4|| 6|| 10|| 1|| 2|| 1|| 0|| 2||14
|-
|6 ||align=left|Lee Hsueh-lin || 14|| 0/5|| 0|| 0/2|| 0|| 0/0|| 0|| 0|| 2|| 2|| 4|| 0|| 0|| 1|| 0||0
|-
|7 ||align=left|Tien Lei || 17|| 2/4|| 50|| 1/2|| 50|| 1/2|| 50|| 2|| 3|| 5|| 3|| 3|| 1|| 0|| 1||6
|-
|8 ||align=left|Chen Shih-chieh || 16|| 0/4|| 0|| 0/3|| 0|| 1/2|| 50|| 0|| 0|| 0|| 5|| 0|| 1|| 0|| 0||1
|-
|9 ||align=left|Hung Chih-shan || 11|| 1/3|| 33.3|| 0/0|| 0|| 0/0|| 0|| 2|| 0|| 1|| 2|| 1|| 1|| 1|| 0||3
|-
|10 ||align=left|Chou Po-Chen || 5|| 2/3|| 66.7|| 2/3|| 66.7|| 0/0|| 0|| 0|| 1|| 1|| 0|| 1|| 0|| 0|| 0||4
|-
|11 ||align=left|Yang Chin-min || 18|| 2/6|| 33.3|| 0/1|| 0|| 0/0|| 0|| 1|| 3|| 4|| 4|| 1|| 1|| 1|| 0||6
|-
|12 ||align=left|Lin Chih-chieh || 14|| 3/4|| 75|| 2/2|| 100|| 0/0|| 0|| 0|| 2|| 2|| 3|| 2|| 4|| 0|| 0||7
|-
|13 ||align=left|Lu Cheng-ju || 27|| 9/14|| 64.3|| 2/2|| 100|| 0/0|| 0|| 0|| 4|| 4|| 2|| 4|| 1|| 0|| 0||25
|-
|14 ||align=left|Tsai Wen-cheng || 20|| 3/7|| 42.9|| 1/3|| 33.3|| 1/2|| 50|| 4|| 2|| 6|| 3|| 2|| 0|| 0|| 0||8
|-
|15 ||align=left|Douglas Creighton || 23|| 5/12|| 41.7|| 1/3|| 33.3|| 2/2|| 100|| 1|| 2|| 3|| 3|| 1|| 0|| 2|| 0||16
|-
|align=left colspan=2|Totals || 200|| 33/70|| 47.1|| 16/32|| 50|| 7/10|| 70|| 15|| 31|| 46|| 30|| 21|| 11|| 5|| 3|| 90
|}

|-
|4 ||align=left|Mohammed Al-Marwani || 34|| 3/11|| 27.3|| 3/11|| 27.3|| 0/0|| 0|| 3|| 7|| 10|| 0|| 3|| 2|| 0|| 1||6
|-
|5 ||align=left|Marzouq Al-Muwallad || 24|| 5/12|| 41.7|| 4/9|| 44.4|| 3/4|| 75|| 0|| 2|| 2|| 0|| 1|| 1|| 0|| 0||14
|-
|6 ||align=left|Mohammed Al-Sager || 10|| 2/4|| 50|| 2/3|| 66.7|| 2/2|| 100|| 0|| 1|| 1|| 1|| 0|| 0|| 0||0 ||6
|-
|7 ||align=left|Jaber Kabe || 19|| 5/8|| 62.5|| 5/7|| 71.4|| 0/0|| 0|| 1|| 1|| 2|| 0|| 4|| 2|| 1|| 0||10
|-
|8 ||align=left|Fahad Belal || 20|| 0/5|| 0|| 0/2|| 0|| 1/2|| 50|| 0|| 3|| 3|| 0|| 2|| 0|| 0|| 0||1
|-
|9 ||align=left|Mustafa Al-Hwsawi || 23|| 0/5|| 0|| 0/2|| 0|| 1/2|| 50|| 6|| 3|| 9|| 0|| 1|| 1|| 0|| 0||1
|-
|10 ||align=left|Mohammed Abujabal || 4|| 1/2|| 50|| 1/2|| 50|| 2/2|| 100|| 0|| 0|| 0|| 0|| 0|| 0|| 0|| 0||4
|-
|11 ||align=left|Turki Al-Muhanna ||colspan=16 align=left|Did not play
|-
|12 ||align=left|Mathna Al-Marwani || 16|| 0/1|| 0|| 0/1|| 0|| 4/6|| 66.7|| 0|| 2|| 2|| 0|| 1|| 4|| 0|| 0||4
|-
|13 ||align=left|Ahmed Al-Mukhtar || 3|| 0/0|| 0|| 0/0|| 0|| 0/0|| 0|| 2|| 0|| 2|| 1|| 0|| 1|| 0|| 0||0
|-
|14 ||align=left|Ayman Al-Muwallad || 27|| 6/14|| 42.9|| 6/12|| 50|| 3/3|| 100|| 1|| 2|| 3|| 0|| 0|| 1|| 0|| 0||15
|-
|15 ||align=left|Nassir Abo Jalas || 20|| 2/8|| 25|| 1/6|| 16.7|| 1/1|| 100|| 1|| 3|| 4|| 1|| 2|| 1|| 0|| 0||6
|-
|align=left colspan=2|Totals || 200|| 24/70|| 34.3|| 22/50|| 40|| 17/22|| 77.3|| 18|| 25|| 43|| 3|| 14|| 13|| 1|| 1|| 67
|}

Jordan vs. Philippines

|-
|4 ||align=left|Fadel Alnajjar ||05 ||0/0 ||0 ||0/0 ||0 ||0/0 ||0 ||1 ||1 ||1 ||0 ||1 ||0 ||0 ||0 ||0
|-
|5 ||align=left|Ahmad Al-Dwairi ||0 ||0/0 ||0 ||0/0 ||0 ||0/0 ||0 ||0 ||0 ||0 ||0 ||0 ||0 ||0 ||0 ||0
|-
|6 ||align=left|Hani Alfaraj ||08 ||0/5 ||0 ||0/5 ||0 ||0/0 ||0 ||1 ||1 ||2 ||2 ||0 ||0 ||3 ||0 ||0
|-
|7 ||align=left|Ahmad Alhamarsheh ||31 ||1/7 ||14 ||0/4 ||0 ||0/2 ||0 ||3 ||5 ||8 ||1 ||3 ||5 ||0 ||0 ||3
|-
|8 ||align=left|Jimmy Baxter ||38 ||6/13 ||46 ||5/9 ||56 ||1/3 ||33 ||1 ||5 ||6 ||2 ||1 ||3 ||0 ||0 ||14
|-
|9 ||align=left|Khaldoon Abu-Ruqayyah ||13 ||1/3 ||33 ||0/0 ||0 ||0/0 ||0 ||1 ||1 ||2 ||1 ||1 ||1 ||0 ||0 ||3
|-
|10 ||align=left|Abdallah AbuQoura ||08 ||1/1 ||100 ||1/1 ||100 ||0/2 ||0 ||1 ||0 ||1 ||0 ||1 ||1 ||0 ||0 ||2
|-
|11 ||align=left|Wesam Al-Sous ||30 ||3/9 ||33 ||0/1 ||0 ||4/4 ||100 ||2 ||1 ||3 ||1 ||2 ||1 ||1 ||2 ||13
|-
|12 ||align=left|Mahmoud Abdeen ||16 ||2/3 ||67 ||1/2 ||50 ||1/2 ||50 ||0 ||0 ||0 ||4 ||2 ||3 ||0 ||0 ||6
|-
|13 ||align=left|Mohammad Shaher Hussein ||16 ||3/5 ||60 ||3/5 ||60 ||3/4 ||75 ||3 ||6 ||9 ||0 ||4 ||1 ||0 ||2 ||9
|-
|14 ||align=left|Mohammad Hadrab ||20 ||6/11 ||55 ||5/9 ||55 ||5/5 ||100 ||2 ||1 ||3 ||0 ||2 ||0 ||0 ||0 ||19
|-
|15 ||align=left|Ali Jamal Zaghab ||14 ||1/4 ||25 ||1/4 ||25 ||0/0 ||0 ||0 ||5 ||5 ||0 ||2 ||0 ||0 ||0 ||2
|-
|align=left colspan=2|Totals ||200 ||24/61 ||39 ||15/36 ||42 ||14/24 ||58 ||14 ||26 ||40 ||12 ||18 ||17 ||4 ||2 ||71
|}

|-
|4 ||align=left|Jimmy Alapag ||06 ||1/2 ||50 ||0/0 ||0 ||0/0 ||0 ||0 ||0 ||0 ||1 ||2 ||1 ||0 ||0 ||3
|-
|5 ||align=left|LA Tenorio ||14 ||1/6 ||17 ||0/1 ||0 ||0/0 ||0 ||2 ||1 ||3 ||4 ||2 ||1 ||0 ||0 ||3
|-
|6 ||align=left|Jeffrei Chan ||26 ||6/10 ||60 ||1/3 ||33 ||0/0 ||0 ||2 ||0 ||2 ||2 ||1 ||0 ||0 ||0 ||17
|-
|7 ||align=left|Jayson William ||22 ||6/18 ||33 ||5/12 ||42 ||3/4 ||75 ||1 ||3 ||4 ||3 ||1 ||1 ||1 ||1 ||16
|-
|8 ||align=left|Gary David ||07 ||0/2 ||0 ||0/2 ||0 ||2/2 ||100 ||0 ||0 ||0 ||1 ||1 ||1 ||0 ||0 ||2
|-
|9 ||align=left|Ranidel de Ocampo ||26 ||4/11 ||36 ||1/5 ||20 ||0/0 ||0 ||2 ||2 ||4 ||0 ||5 ||2 ||0 ||0 ||11
|-
|10 ||align=left|Gabe Norwood ||37 ||2/5 ||40 ||1/3 ||33 ||3/5 ||60 ||4 ||4 ||8 ||4 ||0 ||2 ||2 ||2 ||8
|-
|11 ||align=left|Marcus Douthit ||32 ||4/7 ||57 ||4/7 ||57 ||3/6 ||50 ||1 ||8 ||9 ||1 ||3 ||3 ||1 ||3 ||11
|-
|12 ||align=left|Larry Fonacier ||09 ||0/2 ||0 ||0/1 ||0 ||0/0 ||0 ||0 ||1 ||1 ||0 ||1 ||0 ||0 ||0 ||0
|-
|13 ||align=left|June Mar Fajardo ||02 ||0/0 ||0 ||0/0 ||0 ||0/0 ||0 ||0 ||0 ||0 ||0 ||1 ||1 ||0 ||0 ||0
|-
|14 ||align=left|Japeth Aguilar ||08 ||2/3 ||67 ||2/3 ||67 ||2/2 ||100 ||0 ||2 ||2 ||0 ||1 ||1 ||0 ||0 ||6
|-
|15 ||align=left|Marc Pingris ||10 ||0/1 ||0 ||0/1 ||0 ||0/0 ||0 ||2 ||1 ||3 ||0 ||2 ||0 ||0 ||0 ||0
|-
|align=left colspan=2|Totals ||200 ||26/67 ||39 ||14/40 ||35 ||13/19 ||68 ||14 ||22 ||36 ||16 ||20 ||13 ||4 ||6 ||77
|}

August 3

Philippines vs. Chinese Taipei

|-
|4 ||align=left|Jimmy Alapag || 17|| 3/9|| 33.3|| 2/3|| 66.7|| 2/2|| 100|| 0|| 1|| 1|| 4|| 2|| 1|| 1|| 0||9
|-
|5 ||align=left|LA Tenorio || 2|| 0/0|| 0|| 0/0|| 0|| 0/0|| 0|| 0|| 0|| 0|| 0|| 0|| 0|| 0|| 0||0
|-
|6 ||align=left|Jeffrei Chan || 15|| 0/2|| 0|| 0/0|| 0|| 0/0|| 0|| 0|| 0|| 0|| 0|| 2|| 0|| 0|| 0||0
|-
|7 ||align=left|Jayson William || 29|| 4/15|| 26.7|| 4/12|| 33.3|| 3/4|| 75|| 3|| 5|| 8|| 4|| 3|| 2|| 1|| 0||11
|-
|8 ||align=left|Gary David || 6|| 0/5|| 0|| 0/4|| 0|| 0/0|| 0|| 0|| 1|| 1|| 0|| 1|| 0|| 0|| 0||0
|-
|9 ||align=left|Ranidel de Ocampo || 19|| 5/13|| 38.5|| 2/7|| 28.6|| 0/0|| 0|| 3|| 1|| 4|| 0|| 2|| 0|| 1|| 0||13
|-
|10 ||align=left|Gabe Norwood || 35|| 3/6|| 50|| 2/3|| 66.7|| 2/6|| 33.3|| 1|| 3|| 4|| 3|| 3|| 1|| 0|| 1||9
|-
|11 ||align=left|Marcus Douthit || 30|| 5/9|| 55.6|| 5/9|| 55.6|| 6/8|| 75|| 5|| 5|| 10|| 0|| 2|| 1|| 1|| 2||16
|-
|12 ||align=left|Larry Fonacier || 29|| 8/13|| 61.5|| 3/6|| 50|| 0/0|| 0|| 3|| 1|| 4|| 0|| 1|| 1|| 1|| 0||21
|-
|13 ||align=left|June Mar Fajardo ||colspan=16 align=left|Did not play
|-
|14 ||align=left|Japeth Aguilar || 10|| 0/1|| 0|| 0/1|| 0|| 0/0|| 0|| 0|| 3|| 3|| 1|| 3|| 0|| 0|| 1||0
|-
|15 ||align=left|Marc Pingris || 8|| 0/1|| 0|| 0/1|| 0|| 0/0|| 0|| 1|| 2|| 3|| 1|| 3|| 0|| 0|| 1||0
|-
|align=left colspan=2|Totals || 200|| 28/74|| 37.8|| 18/46|| 39.1|| 13/20|| 65|| 16|| 23|| 39|| 12|| 21|| 8|| 5|| 5||79
|}

|-
|4 ||align=left|Tseng Wen-ting || 27|| 5/6|| 83.3|| 3/3|| 100|| 4/4|| 100|| 0|| 1|| 1|| 5|| 4|| 3|| 0|| 2||16
|-
|5 ||align=left|Quincy Davis || 23|| 3/3|| 100|| 3/3|| 100|| 0/0|| 0|| 0|| 10|| 10|| 1|| 3|| 3|| 0|| 1||6
|-
|6 ||align=left|Lee Hsueh-lin || 29|| 0/1|| 0|| 0/0|| 0|| 0/0|| 0|| 0|| 5|| 5|| 2|| 1|| 2|| 0|| 0||0
|-
|7 ||align=left|Tien Lei || 23|| 7/12|| 58.3|| 3/4|| 75|| 0/0|| 0|| 0|| 3|| 3|| 1|| 2|| 2|| 0|| 0||18
|-
|8 ||align=left|Chen Shih-chieh || 8|| 0/2|| 0|| 0/1|| 0|| 0/0|| 0|| 1|| 0|| 1|| 0|| 0|| 1|| 0|| 0||0
|-
|9 ||align=left|Hung Chih-shan || 2|| 0/0|| 0|| 0/0|| 0|| 0/0|| 0|| 0|| 0|| 0|| 1|| 1|| 0|| 0|| 0||0
|-
|10 ||align=left|Chou Po-Chen ||colspan=16 align=left|Did not play
|-
|11 ||align=left|Yang Chin-min || 6|| 1/2|| 50|| 1/1|| 100|| 0/0|| 0|| 0|| 1|| 1|| 0|| 0|| 0|| 0|| 0||2
|-
|12 ||align=left|Lin Chih-chieh || 35|| 6/14|| 42.9|| 3/8|| 37.5|| 5/8|| 62.5|| 1|| 8|| 9|| 12|| 1|| 3|| 1|| 0||20
|-
|13 ||align=left|Lu Cheng-ju || 35|| 8/14|| 57.1|| 2/5|| 40|| 0/2|| 0|| 2|| 3|| 5|| 0|| 3|| 2|| 0|| 0||22
|-
|14 ||align=left|Tsai Wen-cheng || 3|| 0/1|| 0|| 0/1|| 0|| 0/0|| 0|| 0|| 0|| 0|| 0|| 0|| 0|| 0|| 0||0
|-
|15 ||align=left|Douglas Creighton || 7|| 0/1|| 0|| 0/0|| 0|| 0/0|| 0|| 0|| 0|| 0|| 1|| 1|| 0|| 0|| 0||0
|-
|align=left colspan=2|Totals || 200|| 30/56|| 53.6|| 15/26|| 64.3|| 9/14|| 64.3|| 5|| 32|| 37|| 23|| 16|| 17|| 1||3 ||84
|}

Saudi Arabia vs. Jordan

|-
|4 ||align=left|Mohammed Al-Marwani ||39||6/11||54.55||6/10||60||2/4||50||6||6||12||1||5||4||1||0||14
|-
|5 ||align=left|Marzouq Al-Muwallad ||34||1/6||16.67||1/4||25||3/5||60||1||3||4||5||3||5||2||0||5
|-
|6 ||align=left|Mohammed Al-Sager  ||colspan=16 align=left|Did not play
|-
|7 ||align=left|Jaber Kabe ||33||2/10||20||0/0||0||2/6||33.33||1||3||4||1||2||3||1||0||6
|-
|8 ||align=left|Fahad Belal ||colspan=16 align=left|Did not play
|-
|9 ||align=left|Mustafa Al-Hwsawi ||37||2/5||40||1/3||33.33||0/0||0||2||5||7||0||1||1||0||0||5
|-
|10 ||align=left|Mohammed Abujabal ||colspan=16 align=left|Did not play
|-
|11 ||align=left|Turki Al-Muhanna ||colspan=16 align=left|Did not play
|-
|12 ||align=left|Mathna Al-Marwani ||18||0/7||0||0/3||0||1/2||50||1||5||6||0||3||2||0||0||1
|-
|13 ||align=left|Ahmed Al-Mukhtar ||colspan=16 align=left|Did not play
|-
|14 ||align=left|Ayman Al-Muwallad ||33||4/18||22.22||4/10||40||8/13||61.54||0||2||2||0||2||0||0||0||16
|-
|15 ||align=left|Nassir Abo Jalas ||2||0/0||0||0/0||0||0/0||0||0||0||0||0||1||0||0||0||0
|-
|align=left colspan=2|Totals ||200||15/57||26.32||14/40||35||16/30||53.33||11||24||35||7||17||15||4||0||47
|}

|-
|4 ||align=left|Fadel Alnajjar ||21||0/2||0||0/0||0||0/0||0||0||4||4||2||3||1||3||0||0
|-
|5 ||align=left|Ahmad Al-Dwairi ||2||0/0||0||0/0||0||2/4||50||0||1||1||0||0||0||0||0||2
|-
|6 ||align=left|Hani Alfaraj ||9||0/2||0||0/1||0||0/0||0||2||0||2||1||3||0||1||0||0
|-
|7 ||align=left|Ahmad Alhamarsheh ||30||3/7||42.86||3/6||50||0/0||0||3||5||8||2||1||3||0||1||6
|-
|8 ||align=left|Jimmy Baxter ||29||6/14||42.86||6/11||54.55||3/3||100||2||3||5||3||4||0||0||0||15
|-
|9 ||align=left|Khaldoon Abu-Ruqayyah ||12||2/2||100||1/1||100||0/0||0||1||2||3||0||2||2||0||0||5
|-
|10 ||align=left|Abdallah AbuQoura ||13||1/3||33.33||1/3||33.33||1/3||33.33||0||4||4||2||1||0||0||0||3
|-
|11 ||align=left|Wesam Al-Sous ||21||4/8||50||1/2||50||0/0||0||0||1||1||1||4||3||0||0||11
|-
|12 ||align=left|Mahmoud Abdeen ||13||1/6||16.67||1/3||33.33||0/0||0||0||2||2||1||1||1||1||0||2
|-
|13 ||align=left|Mohammad Shaher Hussein ||4||0/2||0||0/2||0||0/0||0||0||1||1||0||0||0||0||1||0
|-
|14 ||align=left|Mohammad Hadrab ||22||3/7||42.86||2/3||66.66||2/2||100||2||2||4||0||3||3||0||0||9
|-
|15 ||align=left|Ali Jamal Zaghab ||20||5/9||55.56||0/0||0||0/0||0||3||7||10||1||1||0||0||1||10
|-
|align=left colspan=2|Totals ||200||25/62||40.32||20/41||48.78||8/12||66.67||13||32||45||13||23||13||5||3||63
|}

Group A
2013–14 in Jordanian basketball
Group
2013–14 in Taiwanese basketball
2013 in Saudi Arabian sport